Night Time in Nevada  is a 1948 American Western film directed by William Witney and starring Roy Rogers.

Plot
Ran Farrell kills his mining partner and instead of giving the money to his partner's (Jim Andrews) daughter he steals it. Joan (the daughter) shows up to claim her money, and Farrell steals Roy Rogers' cattle to pay her. Then Farrell decides to keep the money and gives false information to Joan about the location of the next robbery. Roy's posse show up at the wrong location and as a result Roy is outnumbered. At one point Farrell attempts to fill Joan's camper with gas and kill her, but is thwarted in the attempt by Roy. A fantastic story with many story twists!

Cast 
Roy Rogers as Roy Rogers
Trigger as Trigger, Roy's Horse
Adele Mara as Joan Andrews
Andy Devine as Cookie Bullfincher
Grant Withers as Ran Farrell
Marie Harmon as Toni Borden
Joseph Crehan as Engineer Casey
George M. Carleton as Attorney Jason Howley
Holly Bane as Henchman Mort
Steve Darrell as Tramp
James Nolan as Jim Andrews
Hank Patterson as Tramp
Bob Nolan as Musician / Cowhand
Sons of the Pioneers as Musicians / Cowhands

Soundtrack 
 Sons of the Pioneers - "Over Nevada" (Written by Tim Spencer)
 Roy Rogers - "The Big Rock Candy Mountain" (Written by Harry McClintock)
 Roy Rogers and the Sons of the Pioneers - "Night-Time In Nevada" (Written by Will E. Dulmage, Clint H. O'Reilly and Richard W. Pascoe)
 Sons of the Pioneers - "Sweet Laredo Lou" (Music by Bob Nolan, lyrics by Ed Morrisey)

Home media
On August 25, 2009, Alpha Video released Night Time in Nevada on Region 0 DVD.

References

External links 

1948 films
1948 Western (genre) films
American black-and-white films
Films directed by William Witney
American Western (genre) films
Films set in Nevada
Republic Pictures films
Trucolor films
1940s English-language films
1940s American films